Deer Park High School is a four-year public secondary school in Deer Park, Washington, the sole traditional high school in the Deer Park School District (#414), north of the city of Spokane in Spokane County.

History and Enrollment
The first high school was completed in 1911; it now serves as the Deer Park City Hall. The current building was the result of an expansion and remodel that was dedicated on October 15, 2010. The building renovation was designed by NAC Architecture, with HVAC engineering by MSI Engineers.

School Administration
Current administration are:
Principal: Joe Feist
Vice Principal: Troy Heuett
Athletic Director: Cameron Gilbert

References

External links

Deer Park School District #414

High schools in Spokane County, Washington
Public high schools in Washington (state)